Yablochkina is an impact crater on Venus. It was named after Aleksandra Yablochkina.

References 

Impact craters on Venus